Spring Hill may refer to:

Places

Australia
 Spring Hill, New South Wales (Orange), a small town near the city of Orange
 Spring Hill, New South Wales (Wollongong), a suburb of the city of Wollongong
 Spring Hill, Queensland, a suburb of Brisbane
 Spring Hill, Victoria, County of Talbot

United Kingdom
 Spring Hill, East Cowes, Isle of Wight, formerly home to the Shedden family

United States

Alabama 
 Old Spring Hill, Alabama, an unincorporated community in Marengo County
 Spring Hill, Barbour County, Alabama, an unincorporated community
 Spring Hill, Butler County, Alabama, an unincorporated community
 Spring Hill, Choctaw County, Alabama, an unincorporated community
 Spring Hill, Conecuh County, Alabama, an unincorporated community
 Spring Hill, Cullman County, Alabama, an unincorporated community
 Spring Hill, Escambia County, Alabama, an unincorporated community
 Spring Hill (Mobile, Alabama), a neighborhood, formerly a separate town
 Spring Hill, Pike County, Alabama, an unincorporated community
 Spring Hill, Walker County, Alabama, an unincorporated community

Arkansas 
 Springhill, Faulkner County, Arkansas, an unincorporated community
 Spring Hill, Hempstead County, Arkansas, location of Dooley's Ferry Fortifications Historic District

California 
 Spring Hill, California, an unincorporated community

Connecticut 
 Spring Hill (Norwalk), a neighborhood
 Spring Hill Historic District (Mansfield, Connecticut)

Florida 
 Spring Hill, Florida
 Spring Hill, Santa Rosa County, Florida

Georgia 
 Spring Hill, Georgia, an unincorporated community

Indiana 
 Spring Hill, Indiana, a town
 Spring Hill, Vigo County, Indiana, a township

Iowa 
 Spring Hill, Iowa, a city

Kansas 
 Spring Hill, Kansas, a city

Kentucky 
 Spring Hill (Ballardsville, Kentucky), on the National Register of Historic Places listings in Oldham County, Kentucky

Massachusetts 
 Spring Hill (Massachusetts), a mountain
 Spring Hill Historic District (Sandwich, Massachusetts)
 Spring Hill, Somerville, Massachusetts, a neighborhood
 Spring Hill Historic District (Somerville, Massachusetts)

Minnesota 
 Spring Hill, Minnesota, a township
 Spring Hill Township, Stearns County, Minnesota, a township

Missouri 
 Spring Hill, Missouri

North Carolina 
 Spring Hill (Raleigh, North Carolina)

Ohio 
 Spring Hill (Massillon, Ohio), on the National Register of Historic Places listings in Stark County, Ohio

Pennsylvania 
 Spring Hill, Pennsylvania, a census-designated place in Cambria County
 Spring Hill–City View (Pittsburgh), a neighborhood in Pittsburgh, Pennsylvania

Tennessee 
 Spring Hill, Tennessee, a town

Texas 
 Spring Hill, Bowie County, Texas
 Spring Hill, Gregg County, Texas, a ghost town

Virginia 
 Spring Hill (Ivy, Virginia)
 Spring Hill (Providence Forge, Virginia)

Education 
 Spring Hill College, in Mobile, Alabama
 Spring Hill Elementary School, in Pittsburgh, Pennsylvania
 Spring Hill High School (disambiguation)
 Spring Hill School District (disambiguation)
 Spring Hill College, part of Moseley School, Birmingham, England

Other uses
 Battle of Spring Hill, during the American Civil War
 HM Prison Spring Hill, a men's prison in Grendon Underwood, Buckinghamshire, England
 Spring Hill station, a Washington Metro station in Tysons Corner, Virginia, United States

See also
 Spring Hill Cemetery (disambiguation)
 Spring Hill Fair, an album by Australian band The Go-Betweens
 Spring Hill Farm (disambiguation)
 Springhill (disambiguation)
 Springhills, a locality in the central Southland region of New Zealand's South Island
 Springhills, Ohio
 Tel Aviv, a city whose name means "Spring Hill"